Parviterebra brazieri is a species of sea snail in the family Columbellidae. This marine species is endemic to marine waters around Australia, where it occurs off Victoria.

Description
The length of the shell attains 14 mm, its diameter 4 mm.

(Original description) The shell is narrowly fusiform, attenuate at both ends. Its aspect is smooth, graceful, thin and translucent. The spire is prominent, acute, equalling the aperture, milky white. The base of the shell is chesnut, but the apex is stained, fulvous, and on the body whorl zoned with four bands of very pale yellow. The shell contains eight whorls, sloping, obliquely ribbed. The ribs are smooth,  rounded, slightly raised, obtusely angular above, obsolete anteriorly. The suture is well impressed. The aperture is narrow and oblong. The outer lip is thin. The inner lip is reflected.

References

 Wilson, B. (1994) Australian marine shells. Prosobranch gastropods. Vol. 2 Neogastropods. Odyssey Publishing, Kallaroo, Western Australia, 370 pp. page(s): 104

Further reading
 Angas G.F. (1875). Descriptions of three new species of shells from Australia. Proceedings of the Zoological Society of London. (for 1875): 389-390, pl. 45
 Adams A. & Angas G.F. (1864 ["1863"]). Descriptions of new species of shells from the Australian seas, in the collection of George French Angas. Proceedings of the Zoological Society of London. 1863(3): 418-428, pl. 37
 Tryon G.W., jr. (1885) Manual of conchology, structural and systematic, with illustrations of the species. (1)7: Terebridae, Cancellariidae, Strombidae, Cypraeidae, Pediculariidae, Ovulidae, Cassididae, Doliidae, pp. 1-64, pl. 1-12 (Terebridae), 65-98, pl. 1-7 (Cancellariidae), 99-152, pl. 1-12 (Strombidae), 153-240, pl. 1-23 (Cypraeidae, by S.R. Roberts), 241-256, 301-304, pl. 1-5 (Pediculariidae and Ovulidae), 257-267, 305-306, pl. 1-6 (Doliidae), 268-300, 307-309, pl. 1-10 (Cassididae). Philadelphia, published by the author

brazieri
Gastropods of Australia
Gastropods described in 1875